The Georgia Innocence Project is a non-profit corporation based in Atlanta, Georgia, United States. Its mission "is to free the wrongly prosecuted through DNA testing, to advance practices that minimize the chances that others suffer the same fate, to educate the public that wrongful convictions are not rare or isolated events, and to help the exonerated rebuild their lives."

It was founded in August 2002 by September Guy and Jill Polster, and was headed by Executive Director Aimee Maxwell. Georgia Innocence Project is now headed by Executive Director Clare Gilbert. Cases that are accepted are assigned to a team of a volunteer lawyer and two interns. Six people have been exonerated by the organization's efforts, the first two being Clarence Harrison in August 2004, and Robert Clark in December 2005.

On January 22, 2007, a third Georgia Innocence Project client, Pete Williams, was freed after spending 21 years in prison. In 1985, a jury convicted Williams for the rape of a Sandy Springs woman. Williams was exonerated based upon DNA evidence. The organization's fourth successful case is that of John White, now 48, who was released from Macon State Prison on December 10, 2007, after twenty-eight years in prison. Through the efforts of the Georgia Innocence Project, the Georgia Bureau of Investigation (GBI) performed DNA testing that proves White is innocent of the August 1979 rape, aggravated assault, burglary and robbery for an attack on an elderly woman in Meriwether County.

The current president of the Georgia Innocence Project is Emory University School of Law Professor Julie Seaman.

Georgia Innocence Project has had cases featured in many podcasts, including the Undisclosed Podcast, Breakdown and Actual Innocence. GIP Exoneree Calvin C. Johnson co-authored Exit to Freedom with Greg Hampikian.

See also
 List of wrongful convictions in the United States
 List of exonerated death row inmates

References

External links
Georgia Innocence Project
Undisclosed Podcast
Breakdown Podcast

Government watchdog groups in the United States
Criminal defense organizations
Innocence Project